Dirk Abels (born 13 June 1997) is a Dutch professional footballer who plays for Sparta Rotterdam as a right back.

Club career
Abels made his professional debut for Jong PSV in the Eerste Divisie on 9 August 2014, the opening matchday of the 2014–15 season, against Achilles '29. 

In June 2016, he signed a contract extension with PSV until 2018. He made his first team debut on 30 October 2018, in a 3–2 loss at home to RKC Waalwijk in the KNVB Cup after extra time. 

Abels signed with Sparta Rotterdam in January 2019, where he won promotion to the Eredivisie via play-offs in his first six months.

References

External links
Dirk Abels at Sparta Rotterdam

1997 births
Living people
People from Udenhout
Association football fullbacks
Dutch footballers
Eredivisie players
Eerste Divisie players
Jong PSV players
PSV Eindhoven players
Sparta Rotterdam players
Footballers from North Brabant